Juan Carlos Oviedo (born 30 April 1993) is an Argentine footballer

He played for Ñublense and San Marcos de Arica.

References
 
 
 

1993 births
Living people
Argentine footballers
Argentine expatriate footballers
San Marcos de Arica footballers
Ñublense footballers
Primera B de Chile players
Chilean Primera División players
Expatriate footballers in Chile
Association football forwards
Footballers from Buenos Aires